Walrus Island may refer to:

Canada
 Akulliqpaak (formerly Walrus Island), Nunavut
 Walrus Island (Cornwallis Island), off Cornwallis Island, Nunavut
 Walrus Island (Daly Bay), in Daly Bay, Nunavut
 Walrus Island (Fisher Strait), Nunavut
 Walrus Island (Hall Lake), on the Melville Peninsula, Nunavut
 Walrus Island (Hudson Bay), Nunavut
 Walrus Island (Hudson Strait), Nunavut
 Walrus Island (Kiluhiqtuq), Nunavut

Greenland
 Walrus Island (Greenland) in the Pendulum Islands

Norway
 Walross-Insel, former German name variant of Hopen Island, Svalbard archipelago, Norway

United States
Walrus Island (Pribilof Islands), in the Bering Sea, Alaska
 Walrus and Kritskoi Islands located in the southeastern shores of the Bristol Bay in the Aleutians East Borough, Alaska
 Walrus Islands in the "Walrus Islands State Game Sanctuary", located close to Hagemeister Island in the Dillingham Census Area, Alaska

References